Phyllodesmium kabiranum is a species of sea slug, an aeolid nudibranch, a marine gastropod mollusc in the family Facelinidae.

Distribution 
The type locality for Phyllodesmium kabiranum is Ishigaki, Okinawa, Japan. It has also been reported from the Philippines, Malaysia and Indonesia.

Description 
This is a large species of Phyllodesmium which has been reported to grow to 75 mm in length.

This species contains zooxanthellae.

Ecology 
The food species for Phyllodesmium kabiranum is a xeniid soft coral.

References

Facelinidae
Gastropods described in 1991